General Gough may refer to:

Charles John Stanley Gough (1832–1912), British Indian Army general
Hubert Gough (1870–1963), British Army general
Hugh Gough, 1st Viscount Gough (1779–1869), British Army general
Hugh Henry Gough (1833–1909), British Indian Army general
Hugh Sutlej Gough (1848–1920), British Army major general
John Gough (British Army officer) (1871–1915), British Army brigadier general